Benjamin Cowan Shields [Lefty or Big Ben] (June 17, 1903 – January 24, 1982) was a middle relief pitcher in Major League Baseball who played from  through  for the New York Yankees (1924–1925), Boston Red Sox (1930) and Philadelphia Phillies (1931). He was born in Huntersville, North Carolina.

In a four-season career, Shields posted 4–0 record with an 8.27 ERA in 13 appearances, including two starts, two complete game, nine strikeouts in 41 innings pitched. He holds the major league record for most career wins without a loss (4), despite his high ERA of 8.27. He benefited from pitching for a powerful Yankees team that featured Babe Ruth and Lou Gehrig among others. He recorded three of his wins towards the end of the 1925 season, winning games by scores of 6-5, 7-6, & 9-8 respectively. He would record an additional win by pitching four scoreless innings in a 1931 game for the Philadelphia Phillies. However, he had entered that game having given up seven earned runs in 2/3 inning which calculated to an ERA of 94.50. It lowered to 13.50 after the outing that resulted in his fourth win, but only appeared in one major league contest after that.

Shields died at the age of 78 in Woodruff, South Carolina.

External links
Baseball Reference
Retrosheet

Boston Red Sox players
New York Yankees players
Philadelphia Phillies players
Major League Baseball pitchers
Baseball players from North Carolina
1903 births
1982 deaths
People from Huntersville, North Carolina